Andre Douglas is an American systems engineer and NASA astronaut candidate.

Early life and education
Douglas is a Virginia native. He earned a bachelor’s degree in mechanical engineering from the United States Coast Guard Academy, a master’s degree in mechanical engineering from the University of Michigan, a master’s degree in naval architecture and marine engineering from the University of Michigan, a master’s degree in electrical and computer engineering from Johns Hopkins University, and a doctorate in systems engineering from the George Washington University.

Career
Douglas served in the U.S. Coast Guard as a naval architect, salvage engineer, damage control assistant, and officer of the deck. He most recently was a senior staff member at the Johns Hopkins University Applied Physics Lab, working on maritime robotics, planetary defense, and space exploration missions for NASA.

Astronaut candidacy
On December 6, 2021, he was revealed to be one of the 10 candidates selected in the 2021 NASA Astronaut Group 23. He will report for duty in January 2022.

References
 

Astronaut candidates

Living people

1986 births
United States Coast Guard Academy alumni

Johns Hopkins University alumni

University of Michigan people
George Washington University alumni